Temilade Openiyi (born 11 June 1995), known professionally as Tems, is a Nigerian singer and songwriter. She rose to prominence after being featured on Wizkid's 2020 single "Essence", which peaked at number 9 on the Billboard Hot 100 chart following the release of the remix version with Justin Bieber. The song earned her a Grammy Award nomination. That same year, she was featured on the song "Fountains" by Drake.

In 2020, Tems released her debut extended play, For Broken Ears. Her second extended play, If Orange Was a Place (2021), was released after she signed a record deal with RCA Records. In 2022, Tems' vocals from her song "Higher" were sampled by Future on his single, "Wait for U", which led to her being credited as a featured artist alongside Drake on the song. It debuted atop the Billboard Hot 100, making her the first African artist to debut at number one and the second Nigerian artist to top the chart. The song earned her the Grammy Award for Best Melodic Rap Performance. Tems covered Bob Marley's "No Woman, No Cry" for the Black Panther: Wakanda Forever soundtrack album in July 2022 and in the same month, her song "Free Mind" from her debut EP debuted on the Billboard Hot 100.

Throughout her career, Tems has received many accolades, including a Grammy Award, two NAACP Image Awards, two BET Awards and two Soul Train Music Awards. She also co-wrote the song "Lift Me Up" by Rihanna, which earned her nominations for the Academy Award for Best Original Song, and the Golden Globe Award for Best Original Song.

Early life 
Temilade Openiyi was born on 11 June 1995, in Lagos, Nigeria, to a Nigerian mother and a British-Nigerian father. The family moved to the United Kingdom shortly after her birth, but she returned to Nigeria at age 5 following her parents' divorce.  Tems resided in Ilupeju before moving to Lekki and later Ajah. Tems attended Dowen College for her secondary education and Monash South Africa for her tertiary education. At school, she was noticed by her music teacher and learned to play the piano. She practised singing with her brother and often used his guitar accompaniment.

Career

2018–2021: Career beginnings and extended plays 
In 2018, Tems quit her job to pursue a career in music. She began to learn self production skills on YouTube and on 18 July 2018, she released her debut single, "Mr Rebel", a song which she produced by herself. On 7 August 2019, she released the single "Try Me". In 2020, DJ Edu chose her as one of "ten artists to watch" that year. On 23 April 2020, Tems was featured alongside fellow Nigerian singer Davido on a reworked version of American singer-songwriter Khalid and English electronic music duo Disclosure's single, "Know Your Worth".

On 25 September 2020, Tems released her debut extended play, For Broken Ears. It was produced primarily by her and the single "Damages" from the EP became another follow up hit to "Try Me", peaking at number one on the Nigerian Apple Music chart and number six on the then-newly launched TurnTable Top 50 chart and garnering five million views on YouTube. On 30 October 2020, Tems was featured on fellow Nigerian singer Wizkid's single, "Essence", from the latter's fourth studio album, Made in Lagos. The song earned her a number one spot on BBC 1Xtra Airplay Chart. and also earned her first career entry on Billboard Hot 100 at number 9. Tems won a Soul Train Music Awards, two NAACP Image Awards, and received a Grammy Award nomination for Best Global Music Performance. On 8 November 2020, Tems was included in The Future Awards Africa: Class of 2020.

On 13 August 2021, a reworked version of "Essence", which contains an additional feature from Canadian singer Justin Bieber, was released, which propelled the song to reach number nine on the Billboard Hot 100. On 3 September 2021, Tems was featured on Canadian rapper and singer Drake's song, "Fountains", from the latter's sixth studio album, Certified Lover Boy, which debuted at number 26 on the Hot 100. On 15 September 2021, Tems released her second extended play, If Orange Was a Place, after being signed to RCA records. It was primarily produced by GuiltyBeatz, and the single "Crazy Tings" was released five days before and peaked at number three on the UK Afrobeats Singles Chart.  Later, Tems reached number one on the Billboard Next Big Sound chart and the Billboard Emerging Artists chart.

2022–present: Breakthrough
On 31 March 2022, Apple Music 1 Launched Leading Vibe Radio Show With Tems. On 2 April, its first episode features an appearance from Muyiwa Awoniyi, and Tunji Balogun. On 29 April 2022, Tems was featured alongside Drake on American rapper Future's single, "Wait for U", from the latter's ninth studio album, I Never Liked You. The song debuted atop the Hot 100, making Tems the first African female artist to top the chart and more so debut atop the chart. The song samples the song "Higher" from For Broken Ears.

In July 2022, Tems covered Bob Marley's No Woman, No Cry for the Marvel movie Black Panther: Wakanda Forever soundtrack which she was credited alongside Rihanna. On 26 July, Tems gained her fourth Hot 100 with her song "Free Mind" from For Broken Ears debuted on the chart. In July 2022, Tems was announced as a guest artist on Beyoncé's album Renaissance, collaborating on the song "Move" with Grace Jones, becoming her fifth entry on the Hot 100. In October 2022, she co-wrote Rihanna's song "Lift Me Up" for the Black Panther: Wakanda Forever soundtrack.

Ludwig Göransson, Rihanna, Ryan Coogler, and Tems were nominated at the 2023 Golden Globe Awards for “Best Original Song — Motion Picture” for “Lift Me Up” from the film Black Panther: Wakanda Forever.

In 2023, Future, Drake, and Tems won the Grammy Award for Best Melodic Rap Performance for “Wait for U.” Thus, it marks the first female Nigerian artiste to win a Grammy Award.

Tems won the Female MVP award at the Soundcity MVP Awards, which were held at the Eko Convention Centre in Lagos in February 2023.

Artistry 
Tems' mother only allowed her to listen to Christian music when Tems was a child. Later in her teenage years, she became interested in R&B and hip hop music. She listened to Destiny's Child, Beyoncé, Lil Wayne, and Aaliyah, and covered Alicia Keys' 2004 single, "If I Ain't Got You", in a live performance. Growing up, she was also interested in artists such as Burna Boy, Lauryn Hill, Adele, Rihanna, Coldplay, Paramore, and Asa. At the age of 15, she stopped listening to other artists in search of her own identity, because "I wanted to learn how to attack a song from what I was feeling, not what Beyoncé would do or anyone else". Her voice has been described as deep, velvety, and androgynous.

Legal issues
On 14 December 2020, Tems was arrested alongside fellow Nigerian singer Omah Lay after they performed in a show in Uganda. The Ugandan police authority identified violation of COVID-19 lockdown protocols as the reason for their arrests, but the two artists felt they were set up. Two days later, the Ugandan government released them, apologised for the arrests and dropped the charges against the two  artists.

Discography

Soundtrack Albums

Extended plays

Singles

As lead artist

As featured artist

Other charted songs

Awards and nominations 

On February 5, 2023, Tems won a Best Melodic Rap Performance Grammy for her collaboration on “Wait For U” with Future and Drake. 
That same month, she won the Female MVP award at the Soundcity MVP Awards held at the Eko Convention Centre in Lagos.

Notes

References

External links
 
 
 

1995 births
21st-century Nigerian women singers
English-language singers from Nigeria
Living people
Nigerian people of British descent
Nigerian rhythm and blues singers
Nigerian women singer-songwriters
RCA Records artists
Singers from Lagos State
Yoruba women musicians
Nigerian alté singers
Grammy Award winners